The Department of Housing was an Australian government department with responsibility for housing, including the administration of housing schemes and grants that existed between December 1963 and November 1973.

Structure
The Department was a Commonwealth Public Service department, staffed by officials who were responsible to the Minister for Housing. When Annabelle Rankin was appointed the Minister of the department in 1966 she became the first woman to administer an Australian Government department.

References

Housing
Ministries established in 1963